Bruiser may refer to:

Music 

The Bruisers, musical pioneers of the Punk/Oi! genre
Bruiser, an indie rock trio that features ex-Local H drummer Joe Daniels
 Bruiser (album), a 2011 album by The Duke Spirit

Film and television 

The Bruiser, a 1916 American drama film
Bruiser (2000 film), a motion picture directed by George A. Romero
Bruiser (2022 film), a film starring Trevante Rhodes
Bruiser (TV series), a BBC television series

Nickname or ring name 
Bru McCoy, American football player
Bruiser Flint (born 1965), American collegiate men's basketball head coach
Bruiser Kinard (1914–1985), American football player nicknamed "Bruiser", member of the Pro Football Hall of Fame
Bruiser Brody, ring name of former American professional wrestler Frank Donald Goodish (1946-1988)
Bob Sweetan (born 1940), American retired professional wrestler, nicknamed "Bruiser", and sex offender
Bruiser Bedlam, a ring name of American professional wrestler Ion Croitoru (born 1965)
The British Bruisers, a former English professional wrestling tag team
Bruiser Costa, a professional wrestler from All-Star Wrestling
Bruiser, a professional wrestler from the United States Wrestling Association

Fictional characters 
Molly Hayes, briefly known as Bruiser, a Marvel Comics character in the series Runaways
Bruiser Khang, in the video game Tales of Destiny
Bruiser, a large demonic enemy in the video game expansion pack Doom 3: Resurrection of Evil
Nick and Rick Bruiser, the final two opponents in Super NES video game Super Punch-Out!!
Bruiser, Elle Woods' chihuahua in the Legally Blonde movies
The Bruisers, fictional neighbors in the animated TV series Mr. Bean

Other uses 

, various British Royal Navy warships
Bruiser (bull), #32Y, a World Champion bucking bull
Chicago Bruisers, a former Arena Football League team (1987-1989)
Bruiser (Pillow Pal), a Pillow Pal dog made by Ty, Inc.
Bruiser and Marigold, costumed mascots for the Baylor University Bears

See also

Dick the Bruiser, nickname of American professional wrestler and football player William Fritz Afflis (1929-1991)
Crystl Bustos (born 1977), American softball player known as "The Big Bruiser"